Mrinalini Mata (born Merna Loy Brown, May 8, 1931 - August 3, 2017) was the fourth President of Self-Realization Fellowship / Yogoda Satsanga Society of India, founded by Paramahansa Yogananda.

Biography 
She was born in Wichita, Kansas, USA. Mrinalini Mata parents were Vera and William Wesley Brown. She spent most of her youth in Southern California. From an early age, she showed an interest in religion, regularly attending church with her family. She was drawn to the teachings of Paramahansa Yogananda at the age of fourteen, after hearing him speak at the Self-Realization Fellowship (SRF) Temple in San Diego, California, which her sister and mother had begun attending. Mrinalini Mata came to live at the SRF Hermitage in Encinitas, California, on June 10, 1946, where she began receiving Yogananda’s guidance and at the same time she finished her final years of high school at the local high school. She entered the SRF monastic order in 1946, at the age of fifteen. Yogananda chose for her the monastic name “Mrinalini” which signifies the purity of the lotus flower, an ancient symbol of spiritual unfoldment. Her mother later also entered the ashram and took the monastic name Meera Mata. Following the passing of the former SRF/YSS president Daya Mata in 2011, she became president of the society until her death in 2017.

Books

References

External links 
 YouTube Channel for Mrinalini Mata 

1931 births

2017 deaths
American women writers
American spiritual writers
American yogis
Devotees of Paramahansa Yogananda
Kriya yogis
People from Wichita, Kansas
Women yogis
Women mystics
Writers from Los Angeles